Luke and the Mermaids is a 1916 American short comedy film featuring Harold Lloyd.

Cast
 Harold Lloyd - Lonesome Luke
 Snub Pollard
 Bebe Daniels
 Charles Stevenson - (as Charles E. Stevenson)
 Billy Fay
 Fred C. Newmeyer
 Sammy Brooks
 Harry Todd
 Bud Jamison
 Margaret Joslin (as Mrs. Harry Todd)
 Dee Lampton
 May Cloy
 John Weiss
 Tod Cregier
 Mary Henderson
 Florence Rose
 Ruth Marzer
 Aileen Allen
 Vera Steadman

See also
 Harold Lloyd filmography

References

External links

1916 films
1916 short films
American silent short films
1916 comedy films
American black-and-white films
Lonesome Luke films
Films directed by Hal Roach
Silent American comedy films
American comedy short films
1910s American films